"Bother" is the second single from the hard rock band Stone Sour's self-titled debut album. It was originally released as a solo song by frontman Corey Taylor, but the billing was later changed to Stone Sour. The song was one of Stone Sour's first songs to put them into the mainstream. The cover features Taylor's hands and rings, one of them being a Spider-Man ring which is a reference to the song being featured on the soundtrack to the film Spider-Man (although the track is credited to Taylor as the performer, not Stone Sour) and to Taylor being a fan of Spider-Man. The other has the number eight on it, representing Taylor's number in Slipknot. Taylor has stated that the song is about when he moved back to Des Moines from Denver, where he hoped to try to move forward with his music.

Music video
The music video shows Taylor standing face-to-face with an exact copy of himself in a large room. As the two sing, Taylor's copy begins to rapidly age, and eventually dies and turns to dust as the other band members surround the two Taylors. All that is left of the copy is his Spider-Man ring, which the other Taylor puts on his own finger, encompassing his own Spider-Man ring. This video was directed by Gregory Dark.

Track listing

Charts

Certifications

Release history

References

Stone Sour songs
2003 songs
Music videos directed by Gregory Dark
Songs written by Corey Taylor
Songs from Spider-Man films
Roadrunner Records singles